Phruronellus is a genus of North American araneomorph spiders first described by R. V. Chamberlin in 1921. Originally placed with the Liocranidae, it was moved to the Corinnidae in 2002, and to the Phrurolithidae in 2014.

Species
 it contains five species, all found in the United States:
Phruronellus californicus Chamberlin & Gertsch, 1930 – USA
Phruronellus floridae Chamberlin & Gertsch, 1930 – USA
Phruronellus formica (Banks, 1895) (type) – USA
Phruronellus formidabilis Chamberlin & Gertsch, 1930 – USA
Phruronellus pictus Chamberlin & Gertsch, 1930 – USA

References

Phrurolithidae
Articles created by Qbugbot